The men's rings competition was one of eight events for male competitors in artistic gymnastics at the 1972 Summer Olympics in Munich. The qualification and final rounds took place on August 27, 29 and September 1 at the Olympiahalle. There were 111 competitors from 26 nations (with 2 of the 113 gymnasts not starting in this apparatus); nations entering the team event had 6 gymnasts while other nations could have up to 3 gymnasts. The top two places were the same as in 1968, while the next two places were taken by the same gymnasts but in the opposite order. The event was won by Akinori Nakayama of Japan, the nation's third consecutive victory in the men's rings; Nakayama was the second man to successfully defend an Olympic title in the event. Mikhail Voronin's second consecutive silver extended the Soviet Union's podium streak in the rings to six Games. Nakayama and Voronin were the fifth and sixth men to earn multiple medals in the rings. Mitsuo Tsukahara of Japan took bronze, switching places with fourth-place finisher Sawao Kato from the previous Games (where Kato took bronze and Tsukahara fourth).

Background

This was the 13th appearance of the event, which is one of the five apparatus events held every time there were apparatus events at the Summer Olympics (no apparatus events were held in 1900, 1908, 1912, or 1920). Four of the six finalists from 1968 returned: gold medalist Akinori Nakayama of Japan, silver medalist Mikhail Voronin of the Soviet Union, bronze medalist Sawao Kato of Japan, and fourth-place finisher Mitsuo Tsukahara of Japan. Nakayama, Tsukahara, and Voronin (in that order) had comprised the podium at the 1970 World Championships.

Liechtenstein, New Zealand, and North Korea each made their debut in the men's rings. The United States made its 12th appearance, most of any nation, having missed only the inaugural 1896 Games.

Competition format

Each nation entered a team of six gymnasts or up to three individual gymnasts. All entrants in the gymnastics competitions performed both a compulsory exercise and a voluntary exercise for each apparatus. The scores for all 12 exercises were summed to give an individual all-around score. (One gymnast who entered the all-around competition did not perform on the vault.) These exercise scores were also used for qualification for the apparatus finals. The two exercises (compulsory and voluntary) for each apparatus were summed to give an apparatus score; the top 6 in each apparatus participated in the finals; others were ranked 7th through 111th. Half of the scores from the preliminary carried over to the final.

Schedule

All times are Central European Time (UTC+1)

Results

One-hundred eleven gymnasts competed in the compulsory and optional rounds on August 27 and 29. The six highest scoring gymnasts advanced to the final on September 1.

References

Official Olympic Report
www.gymnasticsresults.com
www.gymn-forum.net

Men's rings
Men's 1972
Men's events at the 1972 Summer Olympics